Imperial Reckoning: The Untold Story of Britain's Gulag in Kenya is a 2005 non-fiction book written by Caroline Elkins and published by Henry Holt.  It won the 2006 Pulitzer Prize for General Non-Fiction.

Overview
The book describes how, after Operation Anvil, the British colonial government in Kenya turned increasingly to mass detention as a means to suppress the Mau Mau Uprising. Elkins details the establishment and running of the detention camps, the torture and abuse that took place there, and the attempts by the British to destroy records on the eve of Kenya's independence, after having covered up such incidents as the Hola massacre.

This book was also released under the title "Britain's Gulag: The Brutal End of Empire in Kenya," published by Jonathan Cape in 2005.

Bibliography
Imperial Reckoning: The Untold Story of Britain's Gulag in Kenya, Henry Holt/Jonathan Cape, 2005,

References

Further reading

Anderson, D.M. (2015). ″Guilty Secrets: Deceit, Denial, and the Discovery of Kenya’s ‘Migrated Archive’″. History Workshop Journal 80, 142–160.
Parry Marc.  Uncovering the brutal truth about the British empire (18 August 2016), The Guardian.

External links

Pulitzer Prize for General Non-Fiction-winning works
2005 non-fiction books
Books about the British Empire
History books about Kenya
Mau Mau Uprising
British Kenya
Henry Holt and Company books